Aderllan Leandro de Jesus Santos (born 9 April 1989) is a Brazilian professional footballer who plays for Portuguese club Rio Ave F.C. as a central defender.

Club career

Early career
Born in Salgueiro, Pernambuco, Santos joined Salgueiro Atlético Clube's youth setup in 2005 after starting out at Escolinha de Futebol do Tête. He made his debut for the former in 2008, appearing rarely in the Série C.

In summer 2010, after a loan stint at Araripina Futebol Clube, Santos moved abroad, joining C.D. Trofense. He made his debut on 29 August, starting and scoring his team's only in a 2–1 Segunda Liga away loss against Gil Vicente FC.

After being rarely used during his first season, Santos appeared regularly during his second, scoring a career-best six goals in 28 matches.

Braga
On 11 July 2012, Santos signed a two-year contract with S.C. Braga, initially being assigned to the reserves also in the second tier. After being an ever-present figure for the latter, he made his first-team – and Primeira Liga – debut on 9 March of the following year, playing the full 90 minutes in a 2–0 home win over C.S. Marítimo.

Santos scored his first goal in the Portuguese top flight on 3 May 2013, his team's second in a 3–2 victory at Moreirense FC. On 25 September he signed a new five-year deal with a €20 million clause, after the Minho side refused an offer from Stade Rennais FC.

Santos was an undisputed starter the following two campaigns, attracting interest from a number of teams, one of them being AS Monaco FC.

Valencia
On 27 August 2015, Santos agreed to a five-year deal with Valencia CF for a fee of €9.5m. His maiden appearance in La Liga occurred on 22 September, as he played the full 90 minutes in a 1–0 away loss against RCD Espanyol.

Santos had subsequent loan spells in his country's Série A, with São Paulo FC and Esporte Clube Vitória.

Later career
On 24 January 2019, Santos joined Al Ahli Saudi FC. On 13 August, he made a return to Portugal on a season-long loan to Rio Ave FC, signing a permanent contract with the latter club the following May.

Honours
Braga
Taça da Liga: 2012–13

References

External links

1989 births
Living people
Brazilian footballers
Association football defenders
Campeonato Brasileiro Série A players
Campeonato Brasileiro Série C players
Salgueiro Atlético Clube players
Araripina Futebol Clube players
São Paulo FC players
Esporte Clube Vitória players
Primeira Liga players
Liga Portugal 2 players
C.D. Trofense players
S.C. Braga B players
S.C. Braga players
Rio Ave F.C. players
La Liga players
Valencia CF players
Saudi Professional League players
Al-Ahli Saudi FC players
Brazilian expatriate footballers
Expatriate footballers in Portugal
Expatriate footballers in Spain
Expatriate footballers in Saudi Arabia
Brazilian expatriate sportspeople in Portugal
Brazilian expatriate sportspeople in Spain
Brazilian expatriate sportspeople in Saudi Arabia